Asriel (Hebrew origin: Helped by God), in the Bible is the son of Manasseh by his concubine, and founder of the clan of Asrielites.

References

Book of Numbers people